Christopher Kurka is an American politician serving as a member of the Alaska House of Representatives from the 7th district. Elected in November 2018, he assumed office on January 19, 2021.

Career 

Kurka was the director of Alaska Right to Life before being elected to the legislature. In March 2022, Kurka was one of only three members of the lower house to vote to continue to allow fourteen-year-olds to marry with court approval.

He has proposed legislation to move the Alaska State Capitol to Willow, allow the medications Ivermectin and Hydroxychloroquine to be sold without a prescription and prohibit employers from requiring employees to be vaccinated.

Kurka is not running for re-election for his seat in the legislature in 2022 and is a Republican candidate for the 2022 Alaska gubernatorial election.

References

External links 
 Christopher Kurka at Ballotpedia

21st-century American politicians
Living people
Republican Party members of the Alaska House of Representatives
Year of birth missing (living people)